Vedigundu Pasangge is a 2018 Tamil language comedy-drama film from Malaysia. It was the final instalment of Pasangge trilogy film series after Vilayaatu Pasange (2011), and Vetti Pasanga (2014). Vimala Perumal directed the movie with an ensemble cast including Sangeeta Krishnasamy, Denes Kumar, David Anthony, and Thangamani Velayuda. Music and background music were scored by composer duo Vivek–Mervin.

The film had a limited release on 26 July 2018, in Malaysia, Singapore, Sri Lanka, Tamil Nadu and United Kingdom. Vedigundu Pasangge became the first Malaysian Tamil language film to pass the RM  million mark, and went on to surpass Maindhan (2014) to emerge as the highest grossing Tamil Malaysian film of all time. 

The film premiered in Disney+ Hotstar on 1 June 2021.

Synopsis 
The film revolves around a village boy named Theva. He ends up in a twisted situation and realises that everything surrounding him is a mystery. Things take a sour turn for Theva, thanks to his unawareness of the true colours of Boss. Boss uses him as bait, which causes trouble for him. Theva learns one of life's lessons – once bitten, twice shy.

Cast 

 Denes Kumar as Theva
 Sangeeta Krishnasamy as Vithya
 Thangamani Velayudan as Asirvatham
 David Anthony as Mama (Uncle)
 Alvin Martin as Jing Cha
 Magendran Raman as Boss
 Kuben Mahadevan As Cocojelly
 Krishnan Bahador as Kesha
 Pashini Sivakumar as Nila
 Saran Kumar as Saran
 Seelan Manoharan as Inspector Ram
 Prakash Krishna as Corporal Rajan
 Revathy Mariappan as Corporal Sheila

Soundtrack 
The soundtrack was composed by Vivek-Mervin.

Box office 
Vedigundu Pasangge created history by becoming the first and highest-grossing Tamil language movie in Malaysia after crossing RM 1.3 million. Producer Denes Kumar said the earnings were achieved two weeks after the movie opened at 55 cinemas nationwide, as well as five cinemas in the United Kingdom on 26 July. The film earned £222 on the first day in United Kingdom. It was the highest opening collection for a movie from Malaysia in the United Kingdom box office.

Accolades 
A special jury awarded in 30th Malaysia Film Festival for Vedigundu Pasangge for becoming the first Malaysian Tamil language film to collect more than RM1 million and gave Malaysian filmmakers a real reason to celebrate. The film has also won numerous awards in national and international film festivals with its own success. Among them are Malaysia Book of Records for Collection of Highest Indian Movie Theaters in Malaysia, Cinema Worldfest Awards (Musical Comedy), Calcutta International Cult Film Festival (Best Female Film Director) and also the South Film & Arts Academy Festival (Best Editor, Best Art Arrangement, Best Sound Arrangement), Accolade Global Film Competition and the Barcelona Planet Film Festival (Best Screenplay).

References

External links 
 

2010s Tamil-language films
Tamil diaspora in Malaysia
Tamil-language Malaysian films
Malaysian comedy films
Films produced by Gayatri Su-Lin Pillai
2018 films
Astro Shaw films
2018 comedy films